Galatians 6 is the sixth (and the last) chapter of the Epistle to the Galatians in the New Testament of the Christian Bible. It is authored by Paul the Apostle for the churches in Galatia, written between 49–58 CE. This chapter contains Paul's exhortations and also a summary of the key points in the epistle.

Text 
The original text was written in Koine Greek. This chapter is divided into 18 verses.

Textual witnesses
Some early manuscripts containing the text of this chapter are:
Papyrus 46 (~AD 200)
Codex Vaticanus (325-350)
Codex Sinaiticus (330-360)
Papyrus 99 (~400; extant verses 1-15)
Codex Alexandrinus (400-440)
Codex Ephraemi Rescriptus (~450; complete)
Codex Claromontanus (~550)

Work for the Good of All (6:1–10)

This section, in every verse, includes exhortations, which are related to the particular needs of the churches in Galatia.

Verse 2
 Bear one another’s burdens, and so fulfill the law of Christ.

"Bear one another's burdens": can be done by gentle reprove, by comforting those stressed with guilt, by sympathizing in others' sorrow, by praying to God to manifest his pardoning grace, by forgiving other people, when they committed faults, or by accommodating their weakness, by administering help and relief, whether temporal or spiritual, and bear a part with them in their griefs.

"Fulfil the law of Christ": To "fulfill" here to "do" or to "act" in obedience. "The Law of Christ" is "to love one another" in contrast to "the law of Moses". In Judaism, as "Christ" means "Messiah", the so-called "law of the Messiah" is considered preferable to any other.

Verse 7
Do not be deceived: God is not mocked, for whatever one sows, that will he also reap.

Verse 8

For he who sows to his flesh will of the flesh reap corruption, but he who sows to the Spirit will of the Spirit reap everlasting life.

Verse 9
And let us not grow weary while doing good, for in due season we shall reap if we do not lose heart.

Conclusion (6:11–18)
Unlike his other epistles, Paul does not include personal greetings in the end of the epistle. Nonetheless, this part holds the summary and "the hermeneutical key to the whole letter", consisting some key points already discussed previously, but here are emphasized again, such as the topic of 'the new creation' with abolished distinction between the circumcised and uncircumcised.

See also
 Related Bible parts: Job 4, Proverbs 11, 2 Corinthians 9, Galatians 1.

References

Bibliography

External links 
 King James Bible - Wikisource
English Translation with Parallel Latin Vulgate 
Online Bible at GospelHall.org (ESV, KJV, Darby, American Standard Version, Bible in Basic English)
Multiple bible versions at Bible Gateway (NKJV, NIV, NRSV etc.)

06